Sundaya is a genus of sea snails in the family Cerithiopsidae

Species
 Sundaya bancheti Cecalupo & Perugia, 2017
 Sundaya bargibanti Cecalupo & Perugia, 2017
 Sundaya ericae Cecalupo & Perugia, 2018
 Sundaya exquisita W. R. B. Oliver, 1915
 Sundaya laboutei Cecalupo & Perugia, 2017
 Sundaya poigounei Cecalupo & Perugia, 2017
 Sundaya rigneusae Cecalupo & Perugia, 2017
 Sundaya soubzmaignei Cecalupo & Perugia, 2020
 Sundaya spurca Cecalupo & Perugia, 2017
 Sundaya tuberculata Powell, 1927
 Sundaya widmeriana (Cecalupo & Perugia, 2014)
Species brought into synonymy
 Sundaya campbellica A. W. B. Powell, 1955: synonym of Specula campbellica (Powell, 1955)

References

External links
 
 Oliver, W. R. B. (1915). The Mollusca of the Kermadec Islands. Transactions of the New Zealand Institute. 47: 509-568
  Marshall B. (1978). Cerithiopsidae of New Zealand, and a provisional classification of the family. New Zealand Journal of Zoology 5(1): 47-120

Cerithiopsidae